Euell is a name. Notable people with this name include:

Surname
 Jason Euell (born 1977), English football player
 Julian Euell (1929–2019), American jazz bassist

Given name
 Euell Gibbons (1911–1975), American celebrity
 Euell Montgomery (1915–2004), Canadian politician